Dirty Dozen may refer to:

Books, film and television
 The Dirty Dozen (book), 2008 book by Robert A. Levy and William Mellor about twelve Supreme Court decisions
 The Dirty Dozen, a 1967 American war film based on a 1965 novel by E.M. Nathanson
 The Dirty Dozen: Next Mission, a 1985 made-for-TV film
 The Dirty Dozen: The Deadly Mission, a 1987 made-for-TV film
 The Dirty Dozen: The Fatal Mission, a 1988 made-for-TV film
 The Dirty Dozen (filmmaking), a group of American filmmakers who attended the USC School of Cinematic Arts during the 1960s

Music
 Dirty Dozen Brass Band, a New Orleans jazz band
 D12, also known as The Dirty Dozen, a Detroit hip-hop group
 A song recorded by Jelly Roll Morton on The Complete Library of Congress Recordings
 "The Dirty Dozens", noted recordings by Speckled Red

Albums
 The Dirty Dozen (album), by George Thorogood and the Destroyers
 Dirty Dozen (album) by Hugh Cornwell
 Bonkers 12: The Dirty Dozen, a compilation album
 A 2000 hip-hop album by Push Button Objects

Other uses
 Dirty Dozens, a game where participants insult each other until one gives up
 Dirty Dozen (American football), a group of Dallas Cowboys players drafted in 1975
 Dirty Dozen (bicycle competition), a bicycle competition in Pittsburgh, Pennsylvania, featuring 13 steep hills
 Dirty dozen (Stockholm Convention), a group of twelve persistent organic pollutants (POPs)
 Dirty Dozen Motorcycle Club, an outlaw motorcycle club in Arizona
 A research and advocacy project of the Environmental Working Group

See also
 Saddam's Dirty Dozen, a group of people who carried out the orders of Saddam Hussein
 Dirty Baker's Dozen or Sedition Caucus, US members of Congress who voted against certification of the 2020 presidential election
 E. M. Nathanson, author of the novel The Dirty Dozen
 Filthy Thirteen, US Army company that inspired the novel
 Wolf Island (novel), a horror fantasy novel featuring a team of soldiers called the "Dirty Dozen"
 Penelope Garcia, character in the Criminal Minds television series called "Dirty Dozen" in one episode
 Game of Shame, 1983 All-Ireland football championship during which the Dublin team was called "The Dirty Dozen"
 USA men's national basketball team, nicknamed "Dirty Dozen" during the 1998 World Championship
 League of Conservation Voters, American conservation group that targets a "Dirty Dozen" politicians each year
 Waterproof wristlet watch, military watches made by 12 manufacturers
 Dark Triad Dirty Dozen, psychological inventory